Carolyn Crane is an American author of the Disillusionists urban fantasy trilogy, as well as the Associates romantic suspense series. Her novel Off the Edge won a Romance Writers of America RITA Award in 2014 for Best Romantic Suspense, making this the first self-published novel to win a RITA.

Biography
Crane grew up in the suburbs of Chicago and Milwaukee, attending Arrowhead High School in Wisconsin. She studied English literature and earned her BA from the University of Minnesota in 1991 and currently lives in Minneapolis with her husband and two cats.

Crane cites reading Diana Gabaldon's Outlander, Laurell K. Hamilton’s Anita Blake series, and Kelley Armstrong's Bitten in reinspiring her to write after getting her degree.

Crane wrote two unpublished novels before she was picked up by agent Cameron McClure of the Donald Maass Literary Agency. In 2008, McClure sold the first two books of her new urban fantasy trilogy, The Disillusionists, to Bantam/Spectra, a division of Random House. Her debut novel, Mind Games, was released March 23, 2010. Due to low sales, Spectra announced that summer that it would not opt for the third book in the series. The third was sold to Samhain Publishing, Audible.com released all three titles on October 25, 2011, and the series was optioned for TV.

Her first foray into self-publishing was collaborating with Meljean Brook and Jill Myles in the anthology Wild and Steamy, in which Crane had a novella "Kitten-tiger & the Monk" that was a part of the Disilluionists world.

She indicated in an interview with SFF World that she has two new series in development.

Bibliography

Disillusionist Trilogy
1. 
2. 
2.5  in the anthology Wild & Steamy and Novellas & Stories
3. 
3.5

Code of Shadows Series
0.5.   in the anthology Fire & Frost and Novellas & Stories
1.

The Associates Series

Novellas/Short Stories
   in the Mammoth Book of Ghost Romance

Audio

Awards and reception
Critical reception to Crane's work has been positive, with Romantic Times giving the first two books in the Disillusionist Trilogy four and a half stars.

 2014 - Romance Writers of America RITA Award for Best Romantic Suspense, Off the Edge

References

External links
 Author's Blog
 Author's Website
 

Living people
21st-century American novelists
American fantasy writers
American women novelists
American romantic fiction writers
RITA Award winners
Urban fantasy writers
Writers from Minneapolis
Women science fiction and fantasy writers
21st-century American women writers
Women romantic fiction writers
Novelists from Minnesota
Year of birth missing (living people)